The Boundary Commission Trail was a trail in western Canada used by the North American Boundary Commission to survey the Canada–United States border starting in 1872. The North-West Mounted Police (NWMP) also used the trail in their March West in 1874. The trail no longer exists, but is commemorated with a modern highway route that approximately follows the trail used by the NWMP and is called the Red Coat Trail.

American and Canadian surveyors worked together in the difficult task of surveying the border, which was agreed upon in the Treaty of 1818 to be the 49th parallel. They met in September 1872 in Pembina, Dakota Territory, where they spent the winter before heading out in the spring of 1873 to begin surveying and placing markers along the route starting at the Lake of the Woods. The winter of 1873–74 was spent in Willow Bunch, North-West Territories. In the spring they continued their work and the last marker was placed on 8 August 1874 at Waterton Lake. Waterton Lake straddles the 49th parallel in present-day Alberta and Montana.

In Manitoba, the trail is commemorated with signage on Highways 3, 32, and 243.

See also
Fort Dufferin
Red Coat Trail
International Boundary Commission

References

External links
Commission Trail Heritage Region website

Canada–United States border
Historic trails and roads in Alberta
Historic trails and roads in Manitoba
Historic trails and roads in Saskatchewan